The following is a list of players who have captained the Essendon Football Club in the Victorian Football League/Australian Football League (VFL/AFL) and AFL Women's (AFLW).

VFL/AFL

AFL Women's

Sources
 Essendon Football Club – club honours

Essendon
Captains
Essendon Football Club captains